Dasydorylas is a genus of flies in the family Pipunculidae.

Species
Dasydorylas cinctus (Banks, 1915)
Dasydorylas dactylos Motamedinia & Skevington, 2020
Dasydorylas discoidalis (Becker, 1897)
Dasydorylas dolichostigmus (Perkins, 1905)
Dasydorylas dorsalis (Hardy, 1950)
Dasydorylas eucalypti (Perkins, 1905)
Dasydorylas fallax (Perkins, 1905)
Dasydorylas filiformis Kehlmaier, 2005
Dasydorylas forcipus Motamedinia & Skevington, 2020
Dasydorylas gradus Kehlmaier, 2005
Dasydorylas horridus (Becker, 1897)
Dasydorylas infissus (Hardy, 1968)
Dasydorylas lamellifer (Perkins, 1905)
Dasydorylas monothrix (Hardy, 1968)
Dasydorylas nigripedes (Hardy, 1954)
Dasydorylas orientalis (Koizumi, 1959)
Dasydorylas parazardouei Motamedinia & Skevington, 2020
Dasydorylas quasidorsalis (Hardy, 1961)
Dasydorylas roseri (Becker, 1897)
Dasydorylas sericeus (Becker, 1897)
Dasydorylas setosilobus (Hardy, 1972)
Dasydorylas setosus (Becker, 1908)
Dasydorylas sordidatus (Hardy, 1950)
Dasydorylas vulcanus Rafael, 2004
Dasydorylas zardouei Motamedinia & Kehlmaier, 2017

References

Pipunculidae
Brachycera genera
Diptera of Europe
Diptera of Asia
Diptera of Africa
Diptera of Australasia